Pist Idiots are an Australian pub rock band from Revesby, New South Wales. The band's line-up consists of lead vocalist/rhythm guitarist Jack Griffith, drummer Jonathon Sullivan and brothers Joseph (lead guitar) and Thomas (bass) Quine.

The band's name comes from a suggestion by a friend who said "call yourself Pist Idiots" because they were drunk in the garage at the time. " Pist" serves as a homophone of "pissed", which is Australian slang for being exceptionally intoxicated.

Their debut studio album, Idiocracy, was released in September 2021.

History

Pre-2017: Formation
In a 2019 interview with Tone Dead the guitarist and frontman Jack Sniff said "We were just mates from school. We just started playing together in a garage, then a trivia night and then to the Battle of the Bands. A year goes by and we were still hanging out, jamming, making songs and not really thinking too much about anything. Then, we supported our mates' band and started playing maybe once a week and then started playing three times a week for a good year and a half or two years, maybe. So, there was a big period where we were nonstop doing hard gigging."

2017–present: Early EPs and Idiocracy
In May 2017, Pist Idiots released their debut single, "Fuck Off", the lead single from their debut self-titled EP. Following the EPs release, the band toured with The Gooch Palms and Skegss.

In July 2018 Pist Idiots released their second EP titled Princes. It spawned the singles "Leave It At That" and "Smile".

In September 2018, Pist Idiots released their third EP, Ticker. It was their first to be released on vinyl. The EP was proceeded by the singles "Motor Runnin'", "Roundhouse" and "Ticker".

On 10 September 2021, Pist Idiots released their debut studio album, Idiocracy. The album was produced by Alex Cameron and Chris Collins.

Band members
Jack Griffith ("Jack Sniff") – lead vocals, rhythm guitar 
Joseph Quine ("Joey Tomato") – lead guitar, backing vocals 
Thomas Quine ("Tommy Tomato") – bass guitar, backing vocals 
Jonathon Sullivan ("Belton Jon") – drums

Discography

Studio albums

Extended plays

References

2017 establishments in Australia
Australian punk rock groups
Australian surf rock groups
Musical groups established in 2017
New South Wales musical groups